IFCA may refer to:

Religion
 Independent Fundamental Churches of America or IFCA International
 International Fellowship of Christian Assemblies, a North American Pentecostal denomination
 International Forum of Catholic Action, see Directory of International Associations of the Faithful

Other uses
 International Financial Cryptography Association
 International Funboard Class Association, a group devoted to windsurfing
 Inshore Fisheries and Conservation Authority, in England
 Iran Football Coaches Association, headed by Majid Jalali